Mirko Celestino (born 19 March 1974 in Albenga) is an Italian former professional road racing cyclist, specializing in the classic cycle races.  His biggest career achievements to date include winning the monumental classic—Giro di Lombardia, the classic HEW Cyclassics and two-time winner of the semi-classic Milano–Torino. Since retiring from road racing, Celestino has been active in mountain bike racing, achieving a silver medal at the 2010 UCI Mountain Bike Marathon World Championships and a bronze medal at the 2011 UCI Mountain Bike Marathon World Championships.

Career achievements

Major results

1995
 1st  Road race, European Under-23 Road Championships
 1st GP Palio del Recioto
1996
 4th Overall Regio-Tour
1997
 2nd Coppa Placci
 4th Overall Tour Méditerranéen
 6th Milan–San Remo
 7th Trofeo Laigueglia
 10th Paris–Brussels
1998
 1st  Overall Regio-Tour
1st Stage 2
 1st Giro dell'Emilia
 2nd Giro del Lazio
 2nd Coppa Placci
 2nd Paris–Brussels
 2nd Gran Premio di Chiasso
 2nd Giro della Provincia di Reggio Calabria
 2nd Coppa Ugo Agostoni
 3rd E3 Prijs Vlaanderen
 3rd GP Industria Artigianato e Commercio Carnaghese
 3rd GP Villafranca de Ordizia
 6th Tre Valli Varesine
 7th Milano–Torino
 8th Trofeo Laigueglia
1999
 1st Giro di Lombardia
 1st HEW Cyclassics Cup
 1st Coppa Placci
 2nd Japan Cup Cycle Road Race
 3rd Memorial Gastone Nencini
 5th Giro del Lazio
 8th Trofeo Laigueglia
 9th Giro dell'Emilia
 9th Paris–Brussels
2000
 2nd Trofeo Pantalica
 3rd Giro dell'Emilia
 3rd Giro del Lazio
 6th GP Industria & Commercio di Prato
 10th Overall Giro della Provincia di Lucca
2001
 1st Milano–Torino
 1st Tre Valli Varesine
 1st Trofeo Laigueglia
 6th Overall Settimana Internazionale di Coppi e Bartali
2002
 2nd Overall Brixia Tour
1st Stage 2
 4th Liège–Bastogne–Liège
 4th Gran Premio di Chiasso
 5th Trofeo Pantalica
 6th Giro di Toscana
 6th Trofeo Laigueglia
 7th GP Città di Camaiore
 8th Coppa Sabatini
2003
 1st  Overall Settimana Internazionale di Coppi e Bartali
 1st Milano–Torino
 2nd Milan–San Remo
 2nd Gran Premio di Chiasso
 2nd Giro del Lazio
 3rd Overall Brixia Tour
 3rd Coppa Sabatini
 5th Rund um den Henninger Turm
 5th HEW Cyclassics
 5th Trofeo Melinda
 7th GP de Fourmies
 7th Trofeo Laigueglia
 9th Coppa Placci
 9th Overall Tour Méditerranéen
2004
 2nd Overall Settimana Internazionale di Coppi e Bartali
1st Stage 2
 3rd GP Industria & Commercio di Prato
 7th Tour du Haut Var
 7th Gran Premio di Chiasso
 9th Coppa Placci
 9th Amstel Gold Race
2005
 2nd Milano–Torino
 3rd Amstel Gold Race
 3rd Giro dell'Emilia
 3rd Coppa Sabatini
 4th Rund um den Henninger Turm
 4th GP Nobili Rubinetterie
 8th Liège–Bastogne–Liège
 9th Züri Metzgete
 10th Overall Three Days of Bruges–De Panne
2006
 2nd Road race, National Road Championships
 3rd GP Città di Camaiore
 3rd Milano–Torino
 4th Coppa Ugo Agostoni
 6th Clásica de San Sebastián
 6th Giro del Lazio
 6th Memorial Marco Pantani
 7th Trofeo Laigueglia

Grand Tour general classification results timeline

External links

1974 births
Living people
People from Albenga
Italian male cyclists
Italian mountain bikers
Cyclists from Liguria
Sportspeople from the Province of Savona